Leonid Mikhailovich Osyka (March 8, 1940 in Kyiv – September 16, 2001 in Kyiv) was a Ukrainian movie director, producer, and screen writer.

Osyka was awarded the Oleksandr Dovzhenko State Prize of Ukraine, which was established to honor outstanding contributions to the development of Ukrainian cinema.

Selected films
1965 - The One Who Goes Into the Sea ("Та, що входить у море"), director
1968 - The Stone Cross ("Камінний хрест"), director; late 2009 saw the beginning of the digital restoration of this film.
1968 - Who return, will love to the end ("Хто повернеться — долюбить"), director
1971 - Zakhar Berkut ("Заxap Бepкут"), director
1976 - The Disturbed Month of September ("Тривожний місяць вересень"), director
1978 - Sea ("Море"), director
1985 - Earth-reaching bowing ("Вклонися до землі"), director, writer
1987 - Enter, the suffered ones ("Увійдіть, стражденні!"), director, writer
1991 - Gift on Birthday ("Подарунок на іменини"), director, writer
1993 - Hetman's Regalia ("Гетьманські клейноди"), director, writer

References

External links

1940 births
2001 deaths
Ukrainian film directors
Film people from Kyiv
Ukrainian screenwriters
20th-century screenwriters
Laureates of the Oleksandr Dovzhenko State Prize